The 1922 Northern Illinois State Teachers football team represented Northern Illinois State Teachers College in the 1922 college football season. The team competed in the Illinois Intercollegiate Athletic Conference, which was also known as the Little Nineteen; it was the first season they competed in a conference. They were led by third-year head coach Paul Harrison and played their home games at Glidden Field, located on the east end of campus. The Teachers finished the season with an 5–4–1 record and an 3–1–1 record in conference play. Leo Conahan was the team's captain.

Schedule

References

Northern Illinois State
Northern Illinois Huskies football seasons
Northern Illinois State Teachers football